Elsa A. Olivetti is an American materials scientist who is the Esther and Harold E. Edgerton Career Development Professor at the Massachusetts Institute of Technology. Olivetti studies the environmental and economic sustainability of materials.

Early life and education 
Olivetti studied engineering science at the University of Virginia and graduated in 2000. She moved to Massachusetts Institute of Technology for graduate studies, where she investigated composite cathodes for lithium rechargeable batteries. In particular, Olivetti studied how nanoarchitectured electrode materials based on nanoscale vanadium oxide phases could improve batter performance.

Research and career 
Olivetti's research considers materials research and discovery. She looks to understand the impact of human-made materials using analytical models, as well as predicting the impact of novel materials on environments and economies. She has worked to help decision-makers understand the impact of materials substitution and recycling. Olivetti worked with Asics to develop innovative sustainable materials for running shoes.

Olivetti has pioneered materials science education courses, including the Climate and Sustainability Scholars Program. In 2021, she was awarded the MIT Bose Award for materials science education.

Awards and honors 
 2017 Earll M. Murman Award for Excellence in Undergraduate Advising
 2020 Paul Gray Award for Public Service
 2021 MIT Bose Award
 2021 MacVicar Faculty Fellow

Selected publications

References 

Living people
Year of birth missing (living people)
University of Virginia alumni
Massachusetts Institute of Technology alumni
Massachusetts Institute of Technology faculty